Shortwing may refer to:
Shortwing (bird)
Shortwing, a falconer's word for Accipiters ("true hawks")
Shortwing, a common name for Perilestidae, a family of damselflies in the order Odonata

Animal common name disambiguation pages